Madison-Ridgeland Academy (MRA, Madison-Ridgeland) is a private, co-educational school in Madison, Mississippi, for students from K-3 through 12th grade. It was founded in 1969 as a segregation academy. There are 4 divisions; the Kindergarten (K3-K5), the Elementary (1st-5th grade), the Middle School (6th-8th grade), and the High School (9th-12th).

History
Madison-Ridgeland Academy was established in 1969 as a segregation academy, to serve the communities of Madison, Ridgeland and other surrounding cities. MRA was housed in a Madison church for its first year as a school; the following year the school relocated to their first facility on their 25 acre campus. In 1971, MRA joined the Mississippi Private School Association, a group  formed to legitimize segregation academies.

In 1970, MRA was one of three segregation academies named in a lawsuit by the NAACP because the state provided public funding enabling the private schools to prolong school segregation.

In 2019, University of Mississippi chancellor Glenn Boyce was criticized because of his past affiliation with Madison-Ridgeland Academy.

Dress code
The school has a strict dress code and does not allow any bright colored clothing other than school colors nor Black hairstyles such as cornrows, dreadlocks or twists.

Demographics
As of 1986, the school had never enrolled a black student, although it had a nondiscrimination policy and had received several inquiries.
 As of 2012, 95 percent of the students were white, 2 percent were Asian and 2 percent were black.

In 2019 Nicolas Rowan became the school's first African-American salutatorian.

Athletics
The school's sports programs have won multiple MAIS football championships, the most recent being in 2021. The school nickname is Patriots.

Notable people
Glenn Boyce, chancellor of the University of Mississippi coached football at MRA
Jack Carlisle, coached football at MRA
Saahdiq Charles, football tackle, Washington Football Team
Tate Ellington, actor
Dallas Walker, football player
Ruston Webster, scout for the Atlanta Falcons, former general manager of the Tennessee Titans

References

Private middle schools in Mississippi
Private elementary schools in Mississippi
Private high schools in Mississippi
Schools in Madison County, Mississippi
Preparatory schools in Mississippi
Private schools in the Jackson metropolitan area, Mississippi
Segregation academies in Mississippi